Grażyna Bacewicz Biernacka (5 February 1909 – 17 January 1969) was a Polish composer and violinist. She is the second Polish female composer to have achieved national and international recognition, the first being Maria Szymanowska in the early 19th century.

Life 
Bacewicz was born in Łódź.  Her father and her brother Vytautas, also a composer, identified as Lithuanian and used the last name Bacevičius; her other brother Kiejstut identified as Polish. Her father, Wincenty Bacewicz, gave Grażyna her first piano and violin lessons. In 1928 she began studying at the Warsaw Conservatory, where she studied violin with Józef Jarzębski and piano with Józef Turczyński, and composition with Kazimierz Sikorski, graduating in 1932 as a violinist and composer. She continued her education in Paris, having been granted a stipend by Ignacy Jan Paderewski to attend the École Normale de Musique, and studied there in 1932–33 with Nadia Boulanger (composition) and André Touret (violin). She returned briefly to Poland to teach in Łódź, but returned to Paris in 1934 in order to study with the Hungarian violinist Carl Flesch.

After completing her studies, Bacewicz took part in numerous events as a soloist, composer, and jury member. From 1936 to 1938 she was the principal violinist of the Polish Radio Orchestra, which was directed then by Grzegorz Fitelberg. This position gave her the chance to hear much of her own music. During World War II, Grażyna Bacewicz lived in Warsaw. She continued to compose and gave secret underground concerts, where she premiered her Suite for Two Violins.

Bacewicz also dedicated time to family life. She was married in 1936, and in 1942 gave birth to a daughter, a recognized painter. Following the Warsaw uprising they escaped the destroyed city and temporarily settled in Lublin.

After the war, she took up the position of professor at the State Conservatoire of Music in Łódź. At this time she was shifting her musical activity towards composition, drawn by her many awards and commissions. Composition finally became her only occupation from 1954, the year in which she suffered serious injuries in a car accident. She died of a heart attack in 1969 in Warsaw.

Compositions 
Many of her compositions feature the violin. Among them are seven violin concertos, five sonatas for violin with piano, three for violin solo (including an early, unnumbered one from 1929), a Quartet for four violins, seven string quartets, and two piano quintets. Her orchestral works include four numbered symphonies (1945, 1951, 1952, and 1953), a Symphony for Strings (1946), and two early symphonies, now lost.

Works for solo instruments 
 Four Preludes for piano (1924)
 Sonata (for solo violin) (1929) – early work, no number
 Children's Suite for piano (1933)
 3 Groteski for piano (1935)
 Sonata for violin (1941) – premiered at an underground concert in Warsaw
 Polish Capriccio for solo violin (1949)
 Piano Sonata No. 1 (1949) (unpublished)
 Capriccio No. 2 for solo violin (1952)
 Piano Sonata No. 2 (premiered 1953)
 Rondino for piano (1953)
 Two Etudes in Double Notes for piano (1955)
 Sonatina for piano (1955)
 10 Concert Etudes for Piano (1956)
 Sonata No. 2 (for solo violin) (1958)
 Mały tryptyk [Little Triptych] for piano (1965)
 Esquisse for organ (1966)
 Rybki [Fish] for piano (1967)
 4 Capriccios for violin (also trans. for viola) (1968)

Chamber music 

 Quintet for flute, oboe, clarinet, bassoon and horn (1932) – First Prize in the Concours de la Société "Aide aux femmes de professions libres", Paris, 1933
 Variations on a Lithuanian Folksong for violin and piano (1934)
 Trio for oboe, violin and cello (1935)
 Sonata for oboe and piano (1937)
 String Quartet No. 1 (1938)
 String Quartet No. 2 (1942)
 Suite for two violins (1943) – premiere at an underground concert in Warsaw
 Sonata da camera, violin and piano (1945)
 Andante sostenuto (4th mov't of Sonata da camera for cello (or violin) and organ)(1946)

 Sonata No. 2 for violin and piano (1946)
 Capriccio for Violin and Piano (1946)
 Sonata No. 3 for violin and piano (1947)
 String Quartet No. 3  (1947) – Polish Ministry of Culture Award, 1955
 Polish Dance for violin and piano (1948)
 Trio for oboe, clarinet and bassoon (1948)
 Polish Capriccio for clarinet and piano (1949, trans. 1954)
 Melody and Capriccio for violin and piano (1949)
 Sonata No. 4 for violin and piano (1949)
 Quartet for 4 violins (1949)
 Oberek No. 1 for violin and piano (1949)
 String Quartet No. 4 (1951) – First Prize, Concours International pour Quatuor a Cordes, Liège, 1951
 Oberek No. 2 for violin and piano (1951)
 Mazovian Dance for violin and piano (1951)
 Sonata No. 5 for violin and piano (1951)
 Piano Quintet No. 1 (1952)
 Lullaby for violin and piano (1952)
 Slavonic Dance for violin and piano (1952)
 Humoresque for violin and piano (1953)
 String Quartet No. 5 (1955)
 Sonatina for oboe and piano (1955)
 Partita for violin and piano (1955)
 String Quartet No. 6 (1960)
 Quartet for 4 cellos (1964)
 Incrustations for horn and chamber ensemble (1965)
 Piano Quintet No. 2 (1965)
 Trio for oboe, harp and percussion (1965)
 String Quartet No. 7 (1965)

Orchestral works 

 Overture (1943)
 Symphony No. 1 (1945)
 Concerto for String Orchestra (1948) – Polish State Prize, 1950
 Polish Capriccio for violin and orchestra (1949)
 Symphony No. 2 (1951)
 Symphony No. 3 (1952)
 Symphony No. 4 (1953) – Polish Ministry of Culture Prize, 1955
 Partita for orchestra (1955)
 Variations for orchestra (1957)
 Muzyka na smyczki, trąbki i perkusję (Music for strings, trumpets, and percussion) (1958) – Third Prize, Tribune Internationale (UNESCO), Paris 1960
 Pensieri notturni, chamber orchestra (1961)
 Concerto for Symphony Orchestra (1962)
 Musica sinfonica in tre movimenti (1965)
 Divertimento, string orchestra (1965)
 Contradizione for chamber orchestra (1966) – commissioned by Hopkins Center for the Arts, Hanover, New Hampshire
 In una parte (1967)

Concertos 

 Violin
Concerto No. 1 for Violin and Orchestra (1937)
Concerto No. 2 for Violin and Orchestra (1945)
Concerto No. 3 for Violin and Orchestra (1948) – Polish Ministry of Culture Award, 1955
Concerto No. 4 for Violin and Orchestra (1951)
Concerto No. 5 for Violin and Orchestra (1954)
Concerto No. 6 for Violin and Orchestra (1957) – unpublished and never performed [UPDATE: Premiere performance 7 December 2019, Bartłomiej Nizioł, violin; Christoph König, conductor; Warsaw Philharmonic Orchestra / Orkiestra Filharmonii Narodowej. SOURCE: https://www.youtube.com/watch?v=ZTJ7rWwPnEY&t=228s&ab_channel=FilharmoniaNarodowa)]
Concerto No. 7 for Violin and Orchestra (1965) – Belgian Government Prize, Gold Medal – Concours Musical International Reine Elisabeth de Belgique, Brussels, 1965
 Viola
Concerto for Viola and Orchestra (1968)
 Cello
Concerto No. 1 for Cello and Orchestra (1951)
Concerto No. 2 for Cello and Orchestra (1963)
 Piano
Concerto for Piano and Orchestra (1949) – Second prize, Chopin Composition Competition, Warsaw, 1949
Concerto for Two Pianos and Orchestra (1966)

Music for voice and piano 

 Róże [Roses] (1934)
 Mów do mnie, o miły [Speak to Me, My Dear] (1936)
 Three Arabic Songs, for soprano and piano (1938)
 Oto jest noc [Here is the Night] (1947)
 Smuga cienia [A Streak of Shadow] (1948)
 Rozstanie [Leave-taking] (1949)
 Nad wodą wielką i czystą [Over the Big and Clear Waters] (1955)
 Dzwon i dzwonki [Large Bell and Small Bells] (1955)
 Boli mnie głowa [I Have a Headache] (1955)
 Sroczka [Little Magpie] (1956)

Music for voice with orchestra 

 Three Arabic Songs, for tenor and orchestra (1938)
 Olympic Cantata (1948) for choir and orchestra – Mention, Olympic Arts Competition, London, 1948; Polish State Prize, 1948. After the 17th-century comedy by Piotr Baryka.
 Acropolis, a cantata for choir and orchestra (1964) – commissioned for the 600th anniversary of Jagiellonian University.

Choral works 

 Zaloty [Courtship] for male chorus (1968)

Stage works 

 Z chłopa król (Peasant King), a ballet (1953) to the libretto of Artur Maria Swinarski
 Przygoda Króla Artura (The Adventure of King Arthur), a radio opera (1959) – Polish Radio and Television Committee Award, Warsaw, 1960
 Esik in Ostend, a ballet (1964)
 Pożądanie [Desire], orchestra, tape – ballet (1969, unfinished; completed by Bogusław Madey)

Incidental music, film scores, music for radio broadcast 

 Mazur [Mazurka], orchestra (1944)
 Farfarello, Róży (1945)
 O Janku co psom szył buty, incidental music (1945)
 Szkice ludowe, radio orchestra (1948)
 Grotesque, orchestra (1949)
 Waltz, orchestra (1949)
 Serenade, orchestra (1950?)
 Wiwat – taniec wielkopolski No. 1, clarinet, string quartet (1950?)
 Konrad Wallenrod, ilustracja muzyczna 1950)
 Krakowiak, orchestra (1950)
 Polish Dance Suite, orchestra (1950)
 Mazovian Dance for cello and orchestra (1951)
 Nocturne for violin and orchestra (from Sonata No. 5 for violin and piano) (1951)
 Music for animated films (1950s)
 Oberek Noworoczny, orchestra (1952)
 Z chłopa król [Peasant King], orchestral suite for orchestra (1953?)
 Tryptych ludowy, choir, orchestra (1954)
 Nieboskiej Komedii, incidental music (1959)
 Gile, children's song (1960)
 Troilus and Cressida, incidental music (1960)
 Macbeth, incidental music (1960)
 Marysia i krasnoludki, film score (1960)
 Sprawa, incidental music (1961)
 Balladyny, incidental music (1965)
 Mazepy, incidental music (1965)

Honours and awards 
1933: First prize at the Society of Composers, "Aide aux femmes libres de Professions" in Paris for the Quintet for Wind Instruments
1936: Second Prize at the composition competition of the Society for Polish Music Publishing Trio For Oboe, Violin and Cello, an honorable mention for her Sinfonietta for String Orchestra
1949: Second prize (no first awarded) in the Composition Competition. Frederick Chopin, organized by the Polish Composers' Union in Warsaw for the Piano Concerto
1951: First Prize at the International Composition Competition in Liege for String Quartet No. 4
1956 Second Prize at the International Composition Competition in Liege for String Quartet No. 5
1960: III deposit at the International Rostrum of Composers in Paris for Music for strings, trumpet and percussion
1965: Prize of the Belgian Government and the gold medal at the International Competition for Composers in Brussels for Violin Concerto No. 7

In addition, Bacewicz received awards for lifetime achievement. These included the Order of the Banner of Work Class II (1949) and class I (1959), Order of Polonia Restituta Cavalier (1953) and Commander's Cross (1955), and the 10th Anniversary Medal of the Polish People's Republic (1955).

On the centenary of her birth, Polish Post issued a stamp, with a portrait of the artist.

References

Sources

External links 

Bacewicz Page at the Polish Music Center, extended biography and list of works
 Bacewicz at PWM Edition, biography, discography, bibliography, list of works, concerts
 Grażyna Bacewicz, Bach Cantatas site
 
 Free scores by Grażyna Bacewicz at the International Music Score Library Project (IMSLP)
  Profile, Women of Note

1909 births
1969 deaths
20th-century classical composers
20th-century classical violinists
20th-century Polish musicians
20th-century Polish educators
20th-century women composers
20th-century women educators
Polish classical composers
Polish classical violinists
Polish music educators
Polish people of Lithuanian descent
Chopin University of Music alumni
Commanders of the Order of Polonia Restituta
École Normale de Musique de Paris alumni
Women classical composers
Musicians from Łódź
Olympic competitors in art competitions
Recipients of the Order of the Banner of Work
Women classical violinists
Women music educators
Recipients of the State Award Badge (Poland)
Polish women composers
Polish composers